The 1908 United States presidential election in Idaho took place on November 3, 1908. All contemporary 46 states were part of the 1908 United States presidential election. State voters chose three electors to the Electoral College, who selected the president and vice president.

Idaho was won by the Republican nominees, former Secretary of War William Howard Taft of Ohio and his running mate James S. Sherman of New York.

William Jennings Bryan, the Democratic Party candidate, had previously defeated William McKinley in the state in both 1896 and 1900.

Results

Results by county

See also
 United States presidential elections in Idaho

Notes

References

Idaho
1908
1908 Idaho elections